Nianfo (Japanese: ,) is a term commonly seen in Pure Land Buddhism. In the context of Pure Land practice, it generally refers to the repetition of the name of Amitābha. It is a translation of Sanskrit  (or, "recollection of the Buddha").

Indian Sanskrit Nianfo 

The Sanskrit phrase used in India is not mentioned originally in the bodies of the two main Pure Land sutras. It appears in the opening of the extant Sanskrit Infinite Life Sutra, as well as the Contemplation Sutra, although it is a reverse rendering from Chinese, as the following:

namo'mitābhāya buddhāya

The apostrophe and omission of the first "A" in "Amitābha" comes from normal Sanskrit sandhi transformation, and implies that the first "A" is omitted. A more accessible rendering might be:

Namo Amitābhāya Buddhāya

A literal English translation would be "Bow for the sake of Amitābha Buddha". The Sanskrit word-by-word pronunciation is the following;

While almost unknown, and unused outside of the original Sanskrit, the texts provide a recitation of Amitābha's alternate aspect of Amitāyus as;

 namo'mitāyuṣe buddhāya

Again, a more accessible rendering might be;

 Namo Amitāyuṣe Buddhāya

A literal translation of this version would be "Namo Buddha of Infinite Life". Other translations may also be: "I pay homage to the Enlightened One immeasurable" or "I turn to rely on the Enlightened One immeasurable".

Nianfo in various forms 

As the practice of nianfo spread from India to various other regions, the original pronunciation changed to fit various native languages.

In China, the practice of nianfo was codified with the establishment of the separate Pure Land school of Buddhism. The most common form of this is the six syllable nianfo; some shorten it into Ēmítuófó/Āmítuófó.  In the Japanese Jodo Shinshu sect, it is often shortened to na man da bu.

Nianfo variants 
In the Jodo Shinshu tradition in Japan, variant forms of the nianfo have been used since its inception.  The founder, Shinran, used a nine-character  in the Shoshinge and the Sanamidabutsuge (讃阿弥陀佛偈) hymns:

Further, the "restorer" of Jodo Shinshu, Rennyo, frequently inscribed the nianfo for followers using a 10-character :

The latter was originally popularized by Shinran's descendant (and Rennyo's ancestor), Kakunyo, but its use was greatly expanded by Rennyo.

Purpose of Nianfo 

Regarding Pure Land practice in Indian Buddhism, Hajime Nakamura writes that as described in the Pure Land sūtras from India, Mindfulness of the Buddha (Skt. buddhānusmṛti, Ch. nianfo) is the essential practice. These forms of mindfulness are essentially methods of meditating upon Amitābha Buddha. In most Pure Land traditions, mindfully chanting of the name of Amitābha is viewed as allowing one to obtain birth in Amitābha's pure land, Sukhāvatī. It is felt that this act would help to negate vast stores of negative karma that might hinder one's pursuit of buddhahood. Sukhāvatī is a place of refuge where one can become enlightened without being distracted by the sufferings of our existence.

In Chinese Buddhism, the nianfo is specifically taken as a subject of meditation and is often practiced while counting with Buddhist prayer beads. In China, Pure Land practices (including nianfo) was historically performed alongside practices from other traditions such as Tiantai and Chan in an eclectic manner as opposed to any strict sectarian delineations. The modern Chan revitaliser Nan Huai-Chin taught that the nianfo is to be chanted slowly and the mind emptied out after each repetition. When idle thoughts arise, the nianfo is repeated again to clear them. With constant practice, the mind progressively empties and the meditator attains samādhi.

Various Pure Land schools in Japan have different interpretations of the nianfo, often based on faith in Amitābha rather than on meditation. In Jōdo Shinshū, the nianfo is reinterpreted as an expression of gratitude to Amitābha. The idea behind this interpretation is that rebirth into Sukhāvatī is assured the moment one first has faith in Amitābha. This notion was propagated by the 12th century Japanese monk Honen, who wrote extensively about it in his extant writings, such as in the One-Sheet Document (Japanese: 一枚起請文; Rōmaji: Ichimai-kishōmon). Honen, in turn, attributed this teaching (that only nianfo was necessary to obtain rebirth in the Pure Land) to the 7th century Chinese monk Shandao. However, modern academic analysis and dissertation has challenged this traditional narrative. Critical reviews of Shandao's hagiography has shown that he expounded on a variety of methods for attaining rebirth, not just exclusive practice of nianfo/nembutsu. For example, in one tract, "The Meritorious Dharma Gate of the Samādhi Involving Contemplation of the Ocean-like Marks of the Buddha Amitābha" (Chinese: 阿彌陀佛相海三昧功德法門; Pinyin: Ēmítuófó xiāng hǎi sānmèi gōngdé fǎmén)  Shandao prescribes a specific set of rituals and practices (including samādhi meditation and visualization techniques) for helping dying Buddhist devotees avoid “evil destinies” and procure successful rebirth in the Pure Land, which contradicts the notion of faith and nianfo/nembutsu as being a guarantee of unconditional salvation. In another example, Shandao expounded on many dangers that he believed could hinder dying aspirants' rebirths in the Pure Land in his tract, "Correct Mindfulness for Rebirth at the Moment of Death" (Chinese: 臨終往生正念文; Pinyin: Línzhōng wǎngshēng zhèngniàn wén), and other similar records from him also reflect a concern regarding various more complicated requirements for rebirth in the Pure Land, including but not limited to recitation of Amitābha's name on one's deathbed specifically. These reflect a nuanced approach and goes beyond the belief in unconditional salvation as claimed by traditional narrative assumed in Pure Land sects like Jōdo Shinshū and Jōdo-shū.

Origins of the Nianfo 
Andrew Skilton looks to an intermingling of Mahāyāna teachings with Buddhist meditation schools in Kashmir for the rise of Mahāyāna practices related to buddhānusmṛti:

The earliest dated sutra describing the nianfo is the Pratyutpanna Samādhi Sūtra (first century BCE), which is thought to have originated in ancient kingdom of Gandhāra. This sutra does not enumerate any vows of Amitābha or the qualities of his pure land, Sukhāvatī, but rather briefly describes the repetition of the name of Amitābha as a means to enter his realm through meditation.

Both the Infinite Life Sutra  and the Amitābha Sūtra subsequently included instructions for practicing buddhānusmṛti in this manner. However, it has not been determined which sūtra was composed first, and to what degree the practice of buddhānusmṛti had already been popularized in India. Buddhānusmṛti directed at other buddhas and bodhisattvas is also advocated in sūtras from this period, for figures such as Akṣobhya and Avalokiteśvara. The practice of buddhānusmṛti for Amitābha became very popular in India. With translations of the aforementioned sūtras as well as instruction from Indian monks, the practice rapidly spread to East Asia.

Nembutsu-ban

The term nembutsu-ban is applied to the event in Kyoto, Japan in 1207 where Hōnen and his followers were banned from the city and forced into exile. This occurred when the leaders of older schools of Buddhism persuaded the civil authorities to prohibit the newer practices including the recitation of Namu Amida Butsu. The ban was lifted in 1211.

Nianfo in modern history 
Thích Quảng Đức, a South Vietnamese Mahāyāna monk who famously burned himself to death in an act of protest against the anti-Buddhist policies of the Catholic President Ngo Dinh Diem, said the nianfo as his last words immediately before death. He sat in the lotus position, rotated a string of wooden prayer beads, and recited the words "Nam mô A-di-đà Phật" before striking the match and dropping it on himself, continuing to recite Amitabha's name as he burned.

References

Bibliography 
 Baskind, James (2008). The Nianfo in Obaku Zen: A Look at the Teachings of the Three Founding Masters, Japanese Religions 33 (1-2),19-34
 
 Grumbach, Lisa (2005). "Nenbutsu and Meditation: Problems with the Categories of Contemplation, Devotion, Meditation, and Faith", Pacific World, Third Series, 7, 91–105. 
 Inagaki Hisao, trans., Stewart, Harold (2003). The Three Pure Land Sutras, 2nd ed., Berkeley, Numata Center for Buddhist Translation and Research. 
 Jones, Charles B. (2001). Toward a Typology of Nien-fo: A Study in Methods of Buddha-Invocation in Chinese Pure Land Buddhism, Pacific World, Third Series, 3, 219–239. 
 Keenan, John P. (1989). Nien-Fo (Buddha-Anusmrti): The Shifting Structure of Remembrance, Pacific World, New Series 5, 40-52
 Li-Ying, Kuo (1995), La récitation des noms de "buddha" en Chine et au Japon. T'oung Pao, Second Series 81 (4/5), 230-268
 Payne, Richard K. (2005). "Seeing Buddhas, Hearing Buddhas: Cognitive Significance of Nenbutsu as Visualization and as Recitation", Pacific World, Third Series, 7, 110-141

External links 
 The Nian Fo according to the Jodo Shu tradition
 The Tannisho
 The Larger Sutra of Immeasurable Life

Buddhist mantras
Language and mysticism
Pure Land Buddhism
Buddhist meditation
Buddhist devotion